Sidi Slimane is a town and commune in Mégarine District, Touggourt Province, Algeria, located near the city of Touggourt. According to the 2008 census it has a population of 8,072, up from 6,822 in 1998, and an annual growth rate of 1.7%.

Geography

Sidi Slimane lies in a large area of palm plantations on an oasis network that extends from here past Touggourt through to Balidat Ameur. Beyond the oases is the arid and barren landscape of the Sahara, featuring areas of sand dunes (ergs) and flat rocky plains (regs).

Climate

Sidi Slimane has a hot desert climate (Köppen climate classification BWh), with very hot summers and mild winters. Rainfall is light and sporadic, and summers are particularly dry.

Transportation

From the intersection, the town is connected to Biskra to the north, and Touggourt to the south. The train line from Biskra to Touggourt also runs past the town at the locality of Moggar, but there is no station.

Education

4.4% of the population has a tertiary education, and another 14.8% has completed secondary education. The overall literacy rate is 80.7%, and is 87.0% among males and 74.4% among females.

Localities
The commune is composed of three localities:
Sidi Slimane
Moggar
El Har Ihira

References

Neighbouring towns and cities

Communes of Ouargla Province
Cities in Algeria
Algeria